Brazil is a surname. Notable people with the surname include:

 Alan Brazil (born 1959), Scottish broadcaster and former football player
 Angela Brazil (1868–1947), English author
 Brodie Brazil (born 1981), American sportscaster
 Darren Brazil (born 1984), American TV editor, producer and videographer.
 David Brazil (disambiguation), various people
 Derek Brazil (born 1968), Irish footballer
 Ellie Brazil (born 1999), English footballer
 Gary Brazil (born 1962), English footballer
 Mark Brazil (born 1955), English ornithologist, conservationist, author and journalist

See also
 Brasil (surname)
 Brazill
 Brazile

English-language surnames